Phaea canescens is a species of beetle in the family Cerambycidae. It was described by John Lawrence LeConte in 1852. It is known from the United States.

References

canescens
Beetles described in 1852